Guinea is a traditional name for the region of the African coast of West Africa which lies along the Gulf of Guinea. It is a naturally moist tropical forest or savanna that stretches along the coast and borders the Sahel belt in the north.

Etymology 

The etymology of "Guinea" is uncertain. The English term Guinea comes directly from the Spanish word Guinea, which in turn derives from the Portuguese word Guiné. The Portuguese term emerged in the mid-15th century to refer to the lands inhabited by the Guineus, a generic term used by the Portuguese to refer to the 'black' African peoples living south of the Senegal River (in contrast to the 'tawny' Sanhaja Berbers, north of it, whom they called Azenegues). The term "Guinea" is extensively used in the 1453 chronicle of Gomes Eanes de Zurara.  King John II of Portugal took up the title of Senhor da Guiné (Lord of Guinea) from 1481. 

It is believed the Portuguese borrowed Guineus from the Berber term Ghinawen (sometimes Arabized as Guinauha or Genewah) meaning "the burnt people" (analogous to the Classical Greek Aithiops, "of the burned face"). The Berber terms "aginaw" and "Akal n-Iguinawen" mean "black" and "land of the blacks", respectively.

A competing theory, first forwarded by Leo Africanus in 1526, claims that 'Guinea' is derived from Djenné (which he refers to as Gheneo, Genni and Ghinea), the great interior commercial city on the Upper Niger River. Djenné dominated the gold and salt trade across West Africa, from the 11th century (fall of Ghana) until the 13th century (when the Mali invasion disrupted its routes and redirected trade to Timbuktu, hitherto just a small Djenné outpost). It is during the period of Djenné dominance that the term Genewah really comes forward into usage in Arab sources (al-Sudan – Arabic for "blacks" – is used more commonly before).

Other theories try to connect "Guinea" to "Ghana", but this is less certain.  The Ghana Empire is named after the Medieval trading city of Ghanah mentioned already by 11th-century Arab geographers (e.g. al-Bakri), but it is used distinctly from Genewah by Arab sources (e.g. they would say "Ghanah in the country of Genewah").  Conversely, it remains possible that both Ghana and Djenné themselves owe their original city names to the Berber appellation for the blacks that lived there. A possible reconciliation of the theories is that the Berber Ghinawen (blacks) was the source of the Djenné (city), which in turn gave rise to the Arabic Genewah (land dominated by that city), which finally made it into the Portuguese Guiné.

History

In 1478 (during the War of the Castilian Succession), a Castilian armada of thirty-five caravels and a Portuguese fleet fought the battle of Guinea in the waters off Elmina, for the hegemony of the Guinea trade (gold, ivory and black pepper). The war ended both with a Portuguese naval victory and the official recognition by the Catholic Monarchs of the Portuguese sovereignty over most of the African territories in dispute (Treaty of Alcáçovas, 1479). This was the first of many colonial wars among European powers. After the Portuguese and Castilians came the Dutch, French, and British.

The extensive trade in ivory, gold, and slaves made the region wealthy, with a number of centralized kingdoms developing in the 18th and 19th centuries.  These were much smaller than the large states of the wide-open Sahel, but they had far higher population densities and were more centralized politically.  The cohesion of these kingdoms caused the region to show more resistance to European incursions than other areas of Africa. Such resistance, combined with a disease environment hostile to Europeans, meant that much of Guinea was not colonised by Europeans until the very end of the 19th century.

Subdivisions 
Guinea is often subdivided into "Lower Guinea" and "Upper Guinea". Lower Guinea is one of the most densely populated regions of Africa, covering southern Nigeria, Benin, Togo and stretching into Ghana. It includes the coastal regions as well as the interior. Upper Guinea is far less densely populated and stretches from Côte d'Ivoire to Senegal.
 
Within the Republic of Guinea, Lower Guinea refers to the country's coastal plain, while Upper Guinea refers to the country's interior.

European traders in the region subdivided the region based on its main exports.  The eastern portion around Benin and Nigeria was named the Slave Coast. What is now Ghana was called the (British) Gold Coast, a name later given to a British colony in the area which ultimately absorbed earlier European colonies. West of this was the Ivory Coast, still the name of the nation in that region. Farthest west, the area around modern Liberia and Sierra Leone was referred to as either the Pepper Coast or the Grain Coast.

Countries in the Guinea region 

From north to south:
 Senegal (formerly French)
 The Gambia
 Guinea-Bissau (formerly Portuguese Guinea)
 Guinea (formerly French Guinea)
 Sierra Leone (British part of the Pepper Coast, originally Province of Freedom)
 Liberia (from U.S. settlements for ex-slaves on the Pepper Coast)
 Ivory Coast or Côte d'Ivoire
 Ghana (formerly the Gold Coast; Danish Guinea, Dutch Guinea, Portuguese Gold Coast (the first), Prussian Gold Coast and Swedish Guinea all ended up absorbed by the British Gold Coast)
 Togo (formerly Togoland)
 Benin (Dahomey)
 Southern Nigeria
 Western Cameroon (formerly Kamerun)
 Equatorial Guinea (formerly Spanish Guinea)

See also 
 Lower Guinean forests
 Upper Guinean forests
 West Africa
 New Guinea
Guineaman, a ship used to transport slaves from the region of Guinea

Notes

References 
Books
 DIFFIE, Bailey W. and WINIUS, George D. -  Foundations of the Portuguese Empire, 1415-1580, Volume 1, University of Minnesota Press, 1977.
 NEWITT, Malyn-  A history of Portuguese overseas expansion, 1400-1668, Routledge, New York, 2005.

Regions of Africa
Divided regions